Paid the Cost is the only studio album by American rap duo Penthouse Players Clique. It was released on April 28, 1992 via Ruthless and Priority Records. Recording sessions took place at Skip Saylor Recording Studio A in Los Angeles with additional recording at Audio Achievements in Torrance, California. Production was mostly handled by DJ Quik, except for two tracks were produced by Penthouse Players Clique and DJ Battlecat. The album was a success for the group, making it to #76 on the Billboard 200, #28 on the Top R&B/Hip-Hop Albums and #1 on the Heatseekers Albums charts. Three singles were released, "Explanation of a Playa", "Trust No Bitch" and "P.S. Phuk U 2", however only "Explanation of a Playa" would make it to the billboard charts. This would mark the duos only album as they would disband only a year later.

Track listing

Sample credits
Tracks 1 and 17 contains elements from "Introducing the Players" by Ohio Players
Track 2 contains elements from "The Boss" by James Brown
Track 3 contains elements from "Life of Fortune & Fame" by Sly Stone and "I'm the One" by Average White Band
Track 4 contains elements from "Funky Worm" by Ohio Players, "Feel Good" by Fancy and "Just Ain't Me" by 2nd II None
Track 5 contains elements from "Can You Feel It" by The Voices of East Harlem and "God Make Me Funky" by The Headhunters & Pointer Sisters
Track 7 contains elements from "Knucklehead" by Grover Washington Jr. and "Convoy" by Blowfly
Track 8 contains elements from "Pimpin', Leaning', and Feanin'" by The Watts Prophets and "Four Play" by Fred Wesley & The Horny Horns
Track 9 contains elements from "I Know You Got Soul" by Bobby Byrd, "Fool's Paradise" by The Sylvers, "Impeach the President" by The Honey Drippers and "Funky President" by James Brown
Track 10 contains elements from "N.T." by Kool & the Gang, "Fool Yourself" by Little Feat and "Peter Piper" by Run-DMC
Track 11 contains elements from "Who Knows" by Jimi Hendrix
Track 12 contains elements from "When the Levee Breaks" by Led Zeppelin
Track 13 contains elements from "Synthetic Substitution" by Melvin Bliss, "Wino Dealing With Dracula" by Richard Pryor and "The Breakdown (Part II)" by Rufus Thomas
Track 14 contains elements from "So I Can Love You" by The Emotions
Track 15 contains elements from "Sunday and Sister Jones" by Roberta Flack
Track 16 contains elements from "Who'd She Coo?" by Ohio Players

Personnel
Wilbert Bryan Milo – main artist, producer (tracks: 2, 7)
Tweed Cadillac – main artist, producer (tracks: 2, 7)
David Marvin Blake – featured artist (tracks: 4, 13), producer
Eric Wright – featured artist (track 4), executive producer
Jason Lewis – featured artist (track 4)
D-Nasty – vocals (track 7)
Malik – additional vocals (track 14)
Kevin Gilliam – scratches & producer (track 7)
Robert "Fonksta" Bacon – keyboards (track 5), guitar & bass
Stan "The Guitar Man" Jones – guitar & bass (track 11)
Mike "Crazy Neck" Sims – additional guitar (track 12)
Louie Teran – engineering
Donovan "The Dirtbiker" Smith – engineering
Brian Knapp Gardner – mastering
Mark Machado – artwork
Dino Paredes – design
Dean Karr – photography

Chart history

References

External links

1992 debut albums
Penthouse Players Clique albums
Ruthless Records albums
Albums produced by DJ Quik
Albums produced by Battlecat (producer)